Meet the In-Laws may refer to:

Films
Meet the In-Laws (2011 film), South Korean film
Meet the In-Laws (2012 film), Chinese film
Meet the In-Laws (2017 film), Nigerian film

TV episodes
"Meet the In-Laws", a 1967 episode from the American TV series Petticoat Junction
"Meet the In-Laws", a 2012 episode from the American TV series Snooki & Jwoww